Interbank may refer to
 Interbank, a Peruvian bank
 İnterbank, a defunct Turkish bank
 Interbank market, the foreign exchange market of currencies
 a defunct credit card service from MasterCard
 InterBank, a bank in Texas and Oklahoma